Long Valley Caldera is a depression in eastern California that is adjacent to Mammoth Mountain.

Long Valley was formed 760,000 years ago when a very large eruption released hot ash that later cooled to form the Bishop tuff that is common to the area. The eruption emptied the magma chamber under the area to the point of collapse. The second phase of the eruption released pyroclastic flows that burned and buried thousands of square miles. Ash from this eruption blanketed much of the western part of what is now the United States.

Geography

Near the center of the bowl, there is a resurgent dome formed by magmatic uplift. The southeastern slope from the caldera down towards Bishop, California, is filled with the Bishop Tuff, solidified ash that was ejected during the eruption that created the caldera. The Bishop tuff is thousands of feet thick and is cut by the Owens River Gorge, formed during the Pleistocene when the caldera filled with water and overtopped its rim.

Mammoth Mountain is a lava dome complex west of the structural rim of the caldera, consisting of about 12 rhyodacite and dacite overlapping domes. These domes formed in a long series of eruptions from 110,000 to 57,000 years ago, building a volcano that reaches  in elevation.

The Mono–Inyo Craters are a -long volcanic chain situated along a narrow, north–south-trending fissure system extending along the western rim of the caldera from Mammoth Mountain to the north shore of Mono Lake. The Mono-Inyo Craters erupted from 40,000 to 600 years ago, from a magma source separate from the Long Valley Caldera.

The caldera has an extensive hydrothermal system. Casa Diablo Hot Springs at the base of the resurgent dome hosts a geothermal power plant. Hot Creek cuts into part of the resurgent dome and passes through hot springs. The warm water of Hot Creek supports many trout, and is used at the Hot Creek Fish Hatchery.  The creek was closed to swimming in 2006 after geothermal activity in the area increased. There are a number of other hot springs in the area, some of which are open to bathers.

Geology

Caldera

The tectonic causes of the Long Valley volcanism are still largely unexplained and are therefore a matter of much ongoing research. Long Valley is not above a hotspot, such as those which fuel the Yellowstone Caldera or the volcanoes of Hawaii; nor is it the result of subduction such as that which produces the volcanism of the Cascades.

The known volcanic history of the Long Valley Caldera area started a few million years ago when magma began to collect several miles below the surface. Volcanic activity became concentrated in the vicinity of the present site of Long Valley Caldera 3.1 to 2.5 million years ago with eruptions of rhyodacite followed by high-silica rhyolite from 2.1 to 0.8 million years ago. After some time, a cluster of mostly rhyolitic volcanoes formed in the area.

All but one of these volcanoes, 1–2 million year old Glass Mountain (made of obsidian), were destroyed by the major (volcanic explosivity index (VEI) 7) eruption of the area 760,000 years ago, which released  of material from vents just inside the margin of the caldera. (The 1980 Mount St. Helens eruption was a VEI-5 eruption releasing .) About half of this material was ejected in a series of pyroclastic flows of a very hot mixture of noxious gas, pumice, and volcanic ash that covered the surrounding area hundreds of feet deep. One lobe of this material moved south into Owens Valley, past present-day Big Pine, California. Another lobe moved west over the crest of the Sierra Nevada and into the drainage of the San Joaquin River.

However, much of the ejecta went straight up, fell down, and filled the initial caldera about two-thirds full.

Eruptions 

Subsequent eruptions from the Long Valley magma chamber were confined within the caldera with extrusions of relatively hot (crystal-free) rhyolite 700,000 to 600,000 years ago as the caldera floor was uplifted to form the resurgent dome followed by extrusions of cooler, crystal-rich moat rhyolite at 200,000-year intervals (500,000, 300,000, and 100,000 years ago) in clockwise succession around the dome. The declining volcanic activity and increasingly crystalline lava extruded over the last 650,000 years, as well as other trends, suggest that the magma reservoir under the caldera has now largely crystallized and is unlikely to produce large-scale eruptions in the future.

The Long Valley volcano is unusual in that it has produced eruptions of both basaltic and silicic lava in the same geological place.

At that time, the lake surface was at an elevation near . The lake drained sometime in the last 100,000 years after it overtopped the southern rim of the caldera, eroded the sill, and created the Owens River Gorge. A human-made dam in the gorge has created Lake Crowley, a partial restoration of the original lake. Since the great eruption, many hot springs developed in the area, and the resurgent dome has uplifted.

During the last ice age, glaciers filled the canyons leading to Long Valley, but the valley floor was clear of ice. Excellent examples of terminal moraines can be seen at Long Valley. Laurel Creek, Convict Creek, and McGee Creek each have prominent moraines.

Recent activity
In May 1980, a strong earthquake swarm that included four Richter magnitude 6 earthquakes struck the southern margin of the Long Valley Caldera. It was associated with a  dome-shaped uplift of the caldera floor. These events marked the onset of the latest period of caldera unrest that is ongoing. This ongoing unrest includes recurring earthquake swarms and continued dome-shaped uplift of the central section of the caldera accompanied by changes in thermal springs and gas emissions. After the quake, another road was created as an escape route. Its name at first was proposed as the "Mammoth Escape Route" but was changed to the Mammoth Scenic Loop after Mammoth area businesses and land owners complained.

In 1982, the United States Geological Survey under the Volcano Hazards Program began an intensive effort to monitor and study geologic unrest in Long Valley Caldera. The goal is to provide residents and civil authorities with reliable information on the nature of the potential hazards posed by this unrest and timely warning of an impending volcanic eruption, should it develop. Most, perhaps all, volcanic eruptions are preceded and accompanied by geophysical and geochemical changes in the volcanic system. Common precursory indicators of volcanic activity include increased seismicity, ground deformation, and variations in the nature and rate of gas emissions.

Hydrothermal system

The Long Valley Caldera hosts an active hydrothermal system that includes hot springs, fumaroles (steam vents), and mineral deposits. Hot springs exist primarily in the eastern half of the caldera where land-surface elevations are relatively low; fumaroles exist primarily in the western half where elevations are higher. Mineral deposits from thermal activity are found on an uplifted area called the resurgent dome, at Little Hot Creek springs, Hot Creek Gorge, and other locations in the south and east moats of the caldera.

Hot springs discharge primarily in Hot Creek Gorge, along Little Hot Creek, and in the Alkali Lakes area. At the other extreme are springs at Hot Creek Fish Hatchery which contain a small component (2–5%) of thermal water that raises water temperatures about  higher than background temperatures. Use of the warm spring water in the hatchery has increased fish production because trout growth rates are faster in the warm water than in ambient stream temperatures in Long Valley.

In hydrothermal systems the circulation of groundwater is driven by a combination of topography and heat sources. In Long Valley Caldera, the system is recharged primarily from snow-melt in the highlands around the western and southern rims of the caldera. The water from snow-melt and rainfall infiltrates to depths of a few kilometers (miles) where it is heated to at least  by hot rock near geologically young intrusions. This hydrothermal fluid flows laterally, down the hydraulic gradient, from the west to the southeast around the resurgent dome and then eastward to discharge points along Hot Creek and around Crowley Lake. Reservoir temperatures in the volcanic fill decline from  near the Inyo Craters to  near Crowley Lake due to a combination of heat loss and mixing with cold water.

Hot Creek has been a popular swimming hole for decades. Over a dozen people have died in Hot Creek since the late 1960s, but most of these deaths happened to people who ignored the numerous warning signs and attempted to use the hydrothermal pools as hot tubs (like the stream portion of the creek, these pools alternate in temperature but the eruptions in the pools are of super-heated water in already very hot water).  Recent geothermal instability has led to its temporary closure for swimming. Officials are unsure of when (if ever) Hot Creek will officially reopen for swimming.

Hydrothermal activity has altered many rocks in the caldera, transforming them into travertine and clay. At the Huntley clay mine white chalky clay called kaolinite is mined; the kaolinite is exposed on the resurgent dome and appears as a brilliant white band.

Tourism and hiking

The largest tourist attraction in the caldera is the Mammoth Mountain Ski Area: the area offers skiing and snowboarding in the winter, and mountain biking in the summer.  The Hot Creek tourist attraction was closed to swimming in 2006 due to increased geothermal activity.

Hiking and off-road vehicle driving is available throughout the caldera, and in the glacial valleys of the Sherwin Range, immediately to the south of the caldera. Hikers can hike to several lakes in these glacial valleys, including Valentine Lake, Convict Lake, Lake Dorothy, and Laurel Lakes.  Crowley Lake, at the south end of the caldera, is noted for its fishing.

The nearest hotel accommodations to the caldera are in Mammoth Lakes, California. There are also campgrounds scattered throughout the caldera, and in the mountains near the edge of the caldera.

Fatalities

In April 2006, three members of the Mammoth Mountain Ski Area ski patrol died while on duty. All three died from suffocation by carbon dioxide when they fell into a fumarole on the slopes of the mountain while attempting to fence it off.

See also

List of large volume volcanic eruptions in the Basin and Range Province
Glass Mountain
Map of Long Valley-Mono area
Mono–Inyo Craters
Mammoth Geothermal Complex - a geothermal power plant in the area

References

Further reading

External links
 USGS website for the Long Valley Caldera
 

Complex volcanoes
Supervolcanoes
Pleistocene calderas
Valleys of California
Volcanoes of Mono County, California
VEI-7 volcanoes
Calderas of California
Volcanic fields of the Great Basin section
Volcanic fields of California
Inyo National Forest
Pleistocene California
Pleistocene North America
Hot springs of California